This is a list of notable alumni and academics of the University of Freiburg.  22 Nobel laureates are associated with the university and 13 researchers have been honored with the Gottfried Wilhelm Leibniz Prize since it was first awarded in 1986.

Humanities, social sciences, arts

 Günther Anders
 Hannah Arendt
 Hildegard Behrens
 Walter Benjamin
 Götz Briefs
 Rudolf Carnap
 James Demske, S.J., (Ph.D. 1962) – President of Canisius College (1966–1993)
 Davor Dzalto
 Alfred Döblin
 Erasmus of Rotterdam 
 Eugen Fink
 Jonas Grethlein
 Hans F. K. Günther
 Albert Bushnell Hart
 Hermann Eduard von Holst
 Martin Heidegger
 Andreas Hillgruber
 Edmund Husserl
 Karl Jaspers
 Eberhard Jäckel
 Hans Jonas
 Paul Kirchhoff
 Emmanuel Lévinas
 Karl Löwith
 Niklas Luhmann
 Claudio Magris
 Karl Mannheim
 Herbert Marcuse
 Werner Marx
 Friedrich Meinecke
 Marie-Eve Morin
 Wilfred Harold Munro
 Henry Pachter
 Hermann Paul
 Aileen O'Brien
 Heinrich Rickert
 Gerhard Ritter
 James Harvey Robinson
 Franz Rosenzweig
 Nicolae Saramandu
 Kuki Shūzō
 Villy Sørensen
 Humphrey Spender
 Gerd Spittler
 Edith Stein
 Leo Strauss
 Matthew Sweeney
 Gerd Tellenbach
 James Hayden Tufts
 George Vernadsky
 Martin Waldseemüller
 Charles William Wallace
 Max Weber
 Wim Wenders
 Heinrich Joseph Wetzer
 H.C. Wolfart

Politics and law

 Konrad Adenauer
 Richard V. Allen
 M. Cherif Bassiouni
 Hildegard Behrens
 Karl Binding
 Alfred Biolek
 Ernst-Wolfgang Böckenförde
 Ben Bradshaw
 Jürgen Chrobog
 Archibald Cary Coolidge
 Horst Ehmke
 Konstantin Fehrenbach
 Hans Filbinger
 Joseph Goebbels
 John Gormley
 Jürgen-Peter Graf
 Ulrich Haltern
 Volker Kauder
 Julius Leber
 Otto Lenel
 Jutta Limbach
 Carl Otto von Madai
 Thomas de Maizière
 Charles Malik
 Johannes Masing
 Stanisław Mieroszewski
 Cameron Munter
 Karl von Rotteck 
 Panagiotis Pipinelis
 Klaus Scharioth
 Wolfgang Schäuble
 Peter Schlechtriem
 Bernhard Schlink
 Friedrich Schoch
 Elsbeth Schragmüller 
 Gesine Schwan
 Jürgen Schwarze
 Nikolaus Senn
 Zalman Shazar
 Silja Vöneky
 Andreas Voßkuhle
 Joseph Wirth
 Ulrich Zasius

Economics
 
 Franz Böhm
 Walter Eucken
 Friedrich August von Hayek, professor (Nobel Prize 1974, Economics)
 Adolph Wagner

Theology

 Wolfgang Capito
 Daniel Ciobotea
 Johann Eck
 Josef Frings
 Georg Gänswein
 Romano Guardini
 Balthasar Hubmaier
 Karl Lehmann
 Karl Rahner
 Gregor Reisch
 Bernardin Schellenberger
 Franz Anton Staudenmaier
 Robert Zollitsch

Medicine and sciences

 Ludwig Aschoff
 Robert Bárány, student (Nobel Prize 1914, Physiology or Medicine)
 Erwin Baur
 Theodor Bilharz
 Korbinian Brodmann
 Vincenz Czerny
 Heinrich Anton de Bary
 Paul du Bois-Reymond
 Alexander Ecker
 Herman Ehrenberg
 Paul Ehrlich, student (Nobel Prize 1908, Physiology or Medicine)
 Hermann Emminghaus
 Alice Ettinger
 Sidney Farber
 Eugen Fischer
 Ulrich Förstermann
 Otfrid Foerster
 Salome Gluecksohn-Waelsch
 Felix Hausdorff
 Harald zur Hausen, professor (Nobel Prize 2008, Physiology or Medicine)
 Alfred Hegar
 Philip Hench, student (Nobel Prize 1950, Physiology or Medicine)
 Karl Herxheimer
 George de Hevesy, student and professor (Nobel Prize 1943, Chemistry)
 Alfred Hoche
 Karen Horney
 Waldemar Hoven (1903–1948), German Nazi physician executed for war crimes
 J. Hans D. Jensen, student (Nobel Prize 1963, Physics)
 Gustav Killian
 Martin Kirschner
 Magnus von Knebel Doeberitz
 Georges J. F. Köhler, student and professor (Nobel Prize 1984, Physiology or Medicine)
 Otto Krayer
 Hans Adolf Krebs, student and scientist (Nobel Prize 1953, Physiology or Medicine)
 Adolph Kussmaul
 Cornelius Lanczos
 Paul Langerhans
Theodore K. Lawless, American dermatologist, medical researcher, and philanthropist
 Friedrich Wilhelm Levi
 Kurt Lewin
 Erich Lexer
 Ferdinand von Lindemann
 Hubert von Luschka
 Rudolf Robert Maier
 Frank Burr Mallory
 Ernst Messerschmid
 Otto Meyerhof, student (Nobel Prize 1922, Physiology or Medicine)
 Karin B. Michels
 Gustav Mie
 Woldemar Mobitz
 Mario Molina, student (Nobel Prize 1995, Chemistry)
 Paul Morawitz
 Hugo Münsterberg
 Carl Nägeli
 Max Nonne
 Wilhelm Normann
 Christiane Nüsslein-Volhard, scientist (Nobel Prize 1995, Physiology or Medicine)
 Lorenz Oken
 Georgios Papanikolaou
 John Parkinson
 Georg Perthes
 Hagen Pfundner
 Otto Friedrich Ranke, physiologist
 Julius von Sachs
 Bert Sakmann, student (Nobel Prize 1991, Physiology or Medicine)
 Christoph Scheiner
 Otto Schirmer
 Rudolph Schoenheimer
 Hans Spemann, professor (Nobel Prize 1935, Physiology or Medicine)
 Otto Spiegelberg
 Hermann Staudinger, professor (Nobel Prize 1953, Chemistry)
 Mikhail Stepanovich Voronin
 Louis Stromeyer
 Wilhelm Trendelenburg
 Paul Uhlenhuth
 Herbert E. Walter
 Otto Heinrich Warburg, student (Nobel Prize 1931, Physiology or Medicine)".
 August Weismann
 Stephan Westmann, professor of obstetrics
 Robert Wiedersheim, professor of Anatomy between 1887 and 1918.
 Heinrich Otto Wieland, professor (Nobel Prize 1927, Chemistry)
 Adolf Windaus, student and scientist (Nobel Prize 1928, Chemistry)
 Georg Wittig, professor (Nobel Prize 1979, Chemistry)
 Ernst Zermelo, mathematician
Stephanie Zimmermann, physicist

Other
 Rabbi David Cohen,"The Nazirite Rabbi"
 Wilhelm Ehmann (1904–1989), musicologist, conductor, founder and director of the Herford School of Church Music
 Pascal Krauss (Sport Science), wrestler; professional mixed martial artist, former Cage Warriors Welterweight Champion and current UFC Welterweight

References

 
University of Freiburg